Dolynivka  is a village (selo) in Stryi Raion, Lviv Oblast, of Western Ukraine. It belongs to Kozova rural hromada, one of the hromadas of Ukraine.

The village was established around 1835 by Karl Scheiff, the heir of Smozhe. He invited Catholic German settlers from Western Bohemia, fueling the society of Galician Germans. In the same year two other nearby German colonies were established in the same way, Karlsdorf and Annaberg, forming a small language island. Felizienthal became a seat of the German-speaking Catholic parish in 1863, moved here from Karlsdorf.

In the interwar period the village belonged to Poland.

Until 18 July 2020, Dolynivka belonged to Skole Raion. The raion was abolished in July 2020 as part of the administrative reform of Ukraine, which reduced the number of raions of Lviv Oblast to seven. The area of Skole Raion was merged into Stryi Raion.

Notes 

Villages in Stryi Raion
Populated places established in 1835
1835 establishments in Europe